Parliamentary elections were held in Poland on 16 April 1961. They were the third elections to the Sejm, the parliament of the People's Republic of Poland, and fourth in Communist Poland. They took place on 15 April.

Background
The 1961 elections followed the liberalized rules prepared for those in 1957, but compared to the situation five years ago, the Polish society was much more apathetic and disappointed with the government. The elections, as all the others under the communist regimes in Poland, were not free and the results of the 1961 elections are considered to be falsified, again a common occurrence of that time.

The electoral system was very similar to that in East Germany where ostensibly multiple parties were present, but their involvement was tempered by mandatory membership of a "unity list" which was ever loyal to the communist hegemony. In practice, electors only had the choice to approve or disapprove the lists, rather than genuinely get to pick their preferred candidate. There were independents; however, they would get elected only if the majority of voters in a multi-member electorate voted against the official list. Additionally, those who were allowed to register and run as independents had to go through an approval process, which invariably rejected any who were too oppositional. Although there was no blatant falsification like ballot stuffing or overt intimidation of voters who turned out, historiographers of Polish history invariably consider these elections to have been fraudulent - due to the above peculiarities.

Results

The official results were: attendance, 95%. Communist parties' list prepared by Front of National Unity received 89.5% votes. 460 members were elected, 256 from Polish United Workers' Party (PZPR), 117 from United People's Party (ZSL), 39 from Democratic Party (SD), 48 independents (majority, "Social independents" and several, "Catholic independents" from the Znak association). However, as the other parties and "independents" were subordinate to PZPR, its control of the Sejm was total.

References

Further reading
Jerzy Drygalski, Jacek Kwasniewski, No-Choice Elections, Soviet Studies, Vol. 42, No. 2 (Apr., 1990), pp. 295–315, JSTOR
George Sakwa, Martin Crouch, Sejm Elections in Communist Poland: An Overview and a Reappraisal, British Journal of Political Science, Vol. 8, No. 4 (Oct., 1978), pp. 403–424, JSTOR

Poland
1961 in Poland
Parliamentary elections in Poland
Elections in the Polish People's Republic
April 1961 events in Europe
1961 elections in Poland